Asola is a census town in the South Delhi district of Delhi, India. It is best known for the Asola Bhatti Wildlife Sanctuary. It is near to Fatehpur Beri Village

Demographics

 India census, Asola had a population of 5,002. Males constitute 56% of the population and females, 44%. Asola has an average literacy rate of 66%, higher than the national average of 59.5%; 61% for males and 39% for females. 17% of the population is under 6 years of age.

See also
Col. Satsangi's Kiran Memorial AIPECCS Educational Complex

References

 Cities and towns in South Delhi district